Band Jub-e Do (also Romanized as Band Jūb-e Do, meaning "Band Jub 2"; also known as Band-e Jūb, Bandjūb, and Band Jūb-e Chahār Borjī-ye Do) is a village in Beyranvand-e Jonubi Rural District, Bayravand District, Khorramabad County, Lorestan Province, Iran. At the 2006 census, its population was 49, in 10 families.

References 

Towns and villages in Khorramabad County